Michelle Hyland (now Rennie; born 29 March 1984) is a road cyclist from New Zealand. She represented her nation at the 2004 Summer Olympics in the women's road race. She also rode at the 2005 and 2007 UCI Road World Championships.

References

External links
 profile at Procyclingstats.com

1984 births
New Zealand female cyclists
Living people
Sportspeople from Gisborne, New Zealand
Cyclists at the 2004 Summer Olympics
Olympic cyclists of New Zealand
Cyclists at the 2006 Commonwealth Games
Commonwealth Games competitors for New Zealand